Dr Jerry Fishenden has been referred to as "one of the UK’s leading authorities in the world of technology", and appears regularly in a variety of mainstream media. He is also a frequent guest and keynote speaker on the conference circuit, drawing on his background across both private and public sectors.

Overview 

In 1984 he graduated with a BSc (Hons) from the City University, London, where he also later obtained an MPhil in the application of artificial intelligence techniques to composition. City University identify him as one of their famous alumni. In 2013, he was awarded a PhD in creative technologies from De Montfort University's Institute of Creative Technologies.

He was appointed as the specialist adviser to the House of Commons Science and Technology Committee for their inquiry into Digital Government (2018-2019) and is a member of the Scottish Government's Online Identity Assurance Expert Group. He was a cofounder and director of the former Centre for Technology Policy Research, and formerly a senior research fellow in the Centre for Creative Computing at Bath Spa University, and a visiting senior fellow at the London School of Economics Department of Management as well as being a key advisor to the Policy Engagement Network. In November 2010 he was appointed as a specialist adviser to the House of Commons Public Administration Select Committee to assist the committee with their inquiry into government IT. From 2009 to 2010, he was appointed as a member of the Scottish Government's expert panel on identity management and privacy, and has been an invited speaker at the Cambridge Union Society. He was the co-chair of the U.K. Government's Privacy and Consumer Advisory Group from 2011 to 2017.

He has held a variety of the IT industry's most senior positions, including as the UK Government's interim deputy chief technology officer, Microsoft's lead technology policy and strategy advisor; as head of business systems for the UK's chief financial services regulator in the City of London; as an officer of the House of Commons, where he pioneered the Parliamentary data and video network at the Houses of Parliament, as well as putting Parliament on the World Wide Web; and as a director of IT in the National Health Service.

His blog tackles issues at the intersection of technology and policy. Analysts Redmonk have referred to him as being a 'trusted advisor'. His Scotsman article on the proposed Identity Card for the UK, which was the first public commentary on the system by a recognised industry figure, opened up constructive debate on an important topic.

He is a fellow with Chartered status of the British Computer Society (FBCS CITP), a fellow of the Royal Society of Arts (FRSA), a fellow of the Institute for the Management of Information Systems (FIMIS) and a fellow of the Institution of Analysts and Programmers. He is also a long-time member of the Writers Guild of Great Britain.

References

External links 
 CIO, "Whitehall CIO role needs thorough reappraisal"
 The Register, "Can the UK have its identity strategy back, Mr President?"
 The Register, "So what do we do when ID Cards 1.0 finally dies?
 The Financial Times, "New models of security and privacy"
 Scottish Government Press Release, "Improving public confidence in online services"
 The Daily Telegraph, “Who Do They Think We Are?”
 Computer Weekly, “Identity Assurance for the UK”
 Health Service Journal, “Technology as a Transformational Enabler of Health Policy”
 ZDNet, “The Big Interview: Jerry Fishenden”
 The BBC, “European Phishing Gangs Targeted”
 ZDNet, “Open Source Community Wooed by Microsoft”
 The Scotsman, “ID Cards will lead to “massive fraud””
 The Financial Times, “Fishenden climbs the Microsoft ladder”
 Jerry Fishenden’s blog on new technology observations from a UK perspective
 Jerry Fishenden’s research site into the application of new creative technologies

Futurologists
English bloggers
Writers from London
English businesspeople
Living people
Fellows of the British Computer Society
People associated with the London School of Economics
English male writers
British male bloggers
Year of birth missing (living people)